China–Sweden relations are the bilateral relations between :China and :Sweden. Sweden was the second Western country to establish official diplomatic relations with the People's Republic of China, on 9 May 1950.

History

Sweden's and China's ties goes back to the 17th century. Sweden traded with China and this was recorded by Nils Matsson Kiöping, who visited southern China on the Götheborg in 1654 and wrote accounts of his journeys to China upon his return to Sweden. The Swedish East India Company traded with China from 1731 to 1813.

New research on 1913-1917 post-Qing relations claim that the head of the Swedish Geological Survey, Johan Gunnar Andersson's work was part of Sweden's ‘extractive vision’ which dealt with aiding exploitative interests of Swedish industrial and foreign-policy actors by seeking to secure, for Sweden, a quasi-colonial presence in Republican China, centering on large-scale extraction of Chinese iron ore, profit-maximizing iron exports throughout the Pacific region and construction and operation of China's largest steel mills and weapons factories.

20th century 
Sweden was the first Western country to establish official diplomatic relations with the People's Republic of China, which took place on 9 May 1950. For this occasion, chairman Mao Zedong decided to personally receive the Swedish ambassador, Torsten Hammarström, as he presented his letter of credentials, which was quite unusual, and a sign that China attached great importance to this diplomatic breakthrough. Sweden has always supported the People's Republic of China's claim to China's seat in the United Nations.

2000s 
A modern replica of the ship Götheborg was constructed and departed from Göteborg, Sweden, in 2005. The ship reached Shanghai, China, in 2006. The ship was welcomed in Shanghai by King Carl XVI and Queen Silvia of Sweden who made an official visit to China that year. The vessel returned to Göteborg on 9 June 2007, and was welcomed by the president of China, Hu Jintao, who visited Sweden mainly for this reason, and by the King Carl XVI Gustaf and Queen Silvia.

2010s 
The year 2010 marked the 60th anniversary of Chinese-Swedish diplomatic relations. The celebrations drew attention in China, as Sweden had been the first Western country to establish diplomatic relations with the country. This resulted in the creation of the Nordic Confucius Institute in Sweden to further promote and develop China-Swedish relationships.

The disappearance of five Hong Kong booksellers including notably the extrajudicial rendition of author–publisher Gui Minhai, a Swedish national, from his residence in Thailand in late 2015 would catalyse sharp deterioration in relations. The Chinese government had been silent about holding him in custody for three months, at which point a controversial video confession was broadcast on mainland media. On 5 January 2016, the Minister for Foreign Affairs stated that they took a "serious view" on Gui's disappearance.

On 2 September 2018, a Chinese tourist named Zeng caused a diplomatic incident because he had incorrectly booked a hostel accommodation. Zeng and his elderly parents arrived a day early. They were not allowed to sleep in the lobby overnight, and were forcibly ejected by police when they refused to leave. Zeng accused the Swedish police of having used excess violence. The Chinese Foreign Ministry responded with a security warning on travel to Sweden.

In July 2019, British UN Ambassador Karen Pierce delivered a joint international statement on Xinjiang at the United Nations General Assembly's Third Committee on behalf of 23 countries, including Sweden. The countries said they shared concerns raised by the United Nations International Convention on the Elimination of All Forms of Racial Discrimination regarding “credible reports of mass detention; efforts to restrict cultural and religious practices; mass surveillance disproportionately targeting ethnic Uyghurs; and other human rights violations and abuses.” They called on China to comply with its national and international obligations to respect human rights, including freedom of religion, and allow UN human rights monitors access to detention centers.

Continued conflict over Gui Minhai 
In November 2019, Chinese ambassador Gui Congyou threatened Sweden saying that "We treat our friends with fine wine, but for our enemies we use shotguns." over the decision by Swedish PEN to award Gui Minhai the Tucholsky Prize. All eight major Swedish political parties condemned the ambassador's threats. On 4 December, after the prize had been awarded, Ambassador Gui said that one could not both harm China's interests and benefit economically from China; when asked to clarify his remarks he said that China would impose trade restrictions on Sweden. These remarks were backed up by the Chinese Foreign Ministry in Beijing.

The Swedish Ambassador to China, Anna Lindstedt, was recalled for arranging a meeting between the daughter of Gui Minhai and two businessmen representing Beijing without the approval or knowledge of the Swedish Foreign Ministry and indicted for unauthorised contacts with a foreign power.

2020s 

In January 2020, the Chinese Embassy announced that they would be denying Chinese visas to reporters who criticise China or, as they put it, damage the relationship between China and Sweden. The Ambassador called Sweden's press "lightweight" and said they should not have picked a fight with China who is a "heavyweight" and will now retaliate.

In February 2020, Sweden's foreign ministry summoned China's ambassador to demand the release of Gui Minhai, a day after he was sentenced to 10 years in jail on charges of illegally providing intelligence to foreigners.

In 2020, amid the straining of the relations between both countries, Sweden shut down the last of the Confucius teaching programmes in the country. Cities such as Gothenburg, Linköping, Luleå and Västerås have not extended long-standing twinning or partnership agreements with Chinese cities – Shanghai, Guangzhou, Xian and Jinan respectively. The agreement has been renewed continuously but officially expired at the end of 2019.

In June 2020, Sweden openly opposed the Hong Kong national security law.

Trade relations
In 2006, the trade value between the two countries added up to $6.73 billion. As of 2016 Sweden had become China's ninth-largest trading partner in the European Union and China had been Sweden's largest trade partner in Asia for four consecutive years.

Public opinion
Survey published in 2020 by the Pew Research Center found that 85% of Swedes had an unfavourable view of China.
Most Chinese on the contrary have a favorable view on Sweden, or nordic countries in general, mainly due to their high-school textbook which has described the nordic countries as welfare countries 'from cradle to tomb'. But recent Internet surveys have shown more practical and sometimes negative views on Sweden. 
While all Swedes have heard about China, only a small population in China have heard about Sweden and many people cannot tell the difference between Sweden and Switzerland.

See also
Foreign relations of China 
Foreign relations of Sweden
Foreign policy
Ambassador of China to Sweden
Swedish School Beijing
China–European Union relations

References

External links
Embassy of Sweden in China 
Embassy of China in Sweden
Hellström, Jerker (2014) China’s Political Priorities in the Nordic Countries, Swedish Defence Research Agency (FOI)

 
Sweden
Bilateral relations of Sweden